Giuseppe Ayroldi (10 July 1895 – 15 October 1962) was an Italian politician.

Ayroldi was born in Ostuni. He represented the Common Man's Front in the Constituent Assembly of Italy from 1946 to 1948.

References

1895 births
1962 deaths
People from the Province of Brindisi
Common Man's Front politicians
Members of the Constituent Assembly of Italy
Politicians of Apulia